"The Last Time I Saw Her" is a song written by Gordon Lightfoot and recorded by American country music artist Glen Campbell. It was released in June 1971 as the second single from his album of the same name, The Last Time I Saw Her. The song peaked at number 21 on both the U.S. Billboard Hot Country Singles chart and the RPM Country Tracks chart in Canada. Lightfoot had recorded the song for his 1968 album Did She Mention My Name?. Other artists known to have recorded the song include Harry Belafonte (for his 1969 album Homeward Bound), John Arpin (for his 1974 album Love and Maple Syrup), Johnny Mathis (as the B-side of his recording of another of Lightfoot's songs, "Wherefore and Why"), Andy Williams (as the B-side of North American releases of his single "Music from Across the Way"), and Keola & Kapono Beamer (for their 1982 album Tahiti Holiday). In 1974, a Finnish version, "Sun Piirtees Vielä Nään", was recorded by Tapio Heinonen for his album Lämmöllä.

Chart performance

References

1971 singles
Glen Campbell songs
Songs written by Gordon Lightfoot
Gordon Lightfoot songs
Song recordings produced by John Simon (record producer)
Capitol Records singles
1968 songs
Song recordings produced by Al De Lory
United Artists Records singles